Don't Look Down may refer to:

Films and TV
 Don't Look Down (1998 film), television movie produced by Wes Craven
 Don't Look Down (2008 film), Argentine film directed by Eliseo Subiela
 Don't Look Down (TV series), a TV series starring Kevin McCloud

Music
 The original name of Much the Same, a punk rock band from Chicago

Albums
 Don't Look Down (Cerys Matthews album), 2009
 Don't Look Down (Ozark Mountain Daredevils album), 1977
 Don't Look Down (Skylar Grey album), 2013
 Don't Look Down (Mr. Lif album), 2016
 An EP by Danny Sage, formerly of D Generation

Songs
 "Don't Look Down" (Go West song), 1985
 "Don't Look Down" (Bring Me the Horizon song), 2014
 "Don't Look Down" (Martin Garrix song), 2015
 "Don't Look Down", a song by Iggy Pop from the album New Values
 "Don't Look Down", a song by Jennifer Hudson from the album I Remember Me
 "Don't Look Down", a song by Cryoshell from the album Next to Machines

Other
 Don't Look Down, a 2020 novel by Hilary Davidson